"Left Outside Alone" is a song by American recording artist Anastacia from her third studio album, Anastacia. Written primarily by Anastacia as well as Dallas Austin, and Glen Ballard detailing the singer's strained relationship with her estranged father. The song was released as the album's lead single on March 15, 2004, to both critical and commercial success. The song peaked at number one in Australia, Austria, Italy, Spain, and Switzerland; number two in Denmark, Germany, Ireland, the Netherlands, and Norway; and number three in the United Kingdom and Hungary, while overall it became the sixth-biggest-selling European single of 2004.

In the United States, "Left Outside Alone" was another success on the Billboard dance charts, where it reached the top position on the Hot Dance Singles Sales, as well as number five on the Hot Dance Club Play. The track received universal acclaim, with praise coming from Anastacia's new musical sound as well as her new singing sound found in the opening of the song being compared to Evanescence's Amy Lee.

Critical reception
"Left Outside Alone" received universal acclaim from critics. AllMusic editor Matthew Chisling wrote "Stronger tracks on the album include "Left Outside Alone,"..., on which Anastacia berates the listener with cries of frustration in pop/rock at its finest." Caroline Sullivan of The Guardian wrote "Apparent references pop up: "It's not OK, I don't feel safe," runs the chorus to Left Outside Alone." The Independent editor Andy Gill said that this song is "the source of the vulnerability."

Dom Passantino of Stylus Magazine wrote "Left Outside Alone" starts off as if we're being sang to by the Holy Ghost (assuming Kate Bush is the Father and Tori Amos is the Son), over, yes, exactly the same chords that oversaw "Daredevil"... Then Anastacia switches style back to her normal voice… calling it normal seems a fallacy." He later praised the song with these words "genuinely interesting, genuinely experimental, and genuinely good single." Yahoo! Music editor Dann Ginoe praised the song: "With a high-pitched gothic quiver floating atop ambient brooding, "Left Outside Alone"'s opening strains could easily have her mistaken for Evanescence's Amy Lee. The familiar air-raid siren wail does kick in eventually, but it's bellowing to an uncharacteristically snarly, guitar-churning chorus. Yup, that's right, Anastacia's gone rock."

Music videos
Shot in Burbank, California in February 2004, the regular music video for "Left Outside Alone" directed by Bryan Barber. There are actually three music videos for the song. The regular (and first) version was released to the worldwide market, excluding North America.

The regular version begins with Anastacia on a bridge. Later she is walking along a street with a red poster on an advertising pillar. The street is of European style with European cars (a Fiat 500 with a vehicle registration plates of France, a Smart Roadster, and a Citroën DS). Then she gets in a car, and whilst driving, she looks into a car next to her and sees "herself" canoodling passionately with a man. When she gets out of the car she notices people dancing to her song on the street.

The alternate version of this video, known as the "blue-poster version", was made for the Jason Nevins Global Club Edit of the song, contains different edits, including the usage of a blue poster instead of the red one, and it also has a different ending.

In 2005, a completely new video was released for American audiences. Shot on May 19–20, 2005, this version was directed by David Lippman and Charles Mehling, and was shot in Los Angeles, California. Although this version was recorded specially for the American market, "Left Outside Alone" was never officially released there. In this version, Anastacia is in a castle lying alone in a bed surrounded by candles.

Part 2
A different version of the track (entitled "Left Outside Alone, Part 2") appears on the deluxe edition of Anastacia's sixth studio album Resurrection. This version features an alternative melody for the same lyrics heard in the original song. She was quoted as saying: "Ten years later, I'm putting out an album and I wanted to revisit that song. I gave myself an opportunity to do that. I loved it and it's a completely different perspective on the song."

Track listings

US 12-inch single
A1. "Left Outside Alone" (Jason Nevins Global Club) – 8:05
A2. "Left Outside Alone" (radio edit) – 3:55
B1. "Left Outside Alone" (Jason Nevins Global Club Edit) – 4:16
B2. "Left Outside Alone" (album version) – 4:17

US maxi-CD single
 "Left Outside Alone" (radio edit) – 3:55
 "Get Ready" – 3:30
 "Left Outside Alone" (Jason Nevins Global Club Edit) – 4:16
 "Left Outside Alone" (Jason Nevins Global Club) – 8:05
 "Left Outside Alone" (Jason Nevins Mix Show) – 5:35

UK and European CD single
 "Left Outside Alone" (radio edit) – 3:40
 "Get Ready" – 3:30

European maxi-CD single
 "Left Outside Alone" (radio edit) – 3:40
 "Get Ready" – 3:30
 "Left Outside Alone" (Jason Nevins Global Club Edit) – 8:05
 "Left Outside Alone" (Jason Nevins Mix Show Edit) – 3:14
 "Left Outside Alone" (M*A*S*H Rock Mix) – 4:04

German mini-CD single
 "Left Outside Alone" – 3:40
 "Left Outside Alone" (Jason Nevins Global Club Edit) – 4:16

Australian CD single
 "Left Outside Alone" (radio edit) – 3:40
 "Get Ready" – 3:30
 "Left Outside Alone" (Jason Nevins Global Club Edit) – 4:16

Credits and personnel
Credits are taken from the Anastacia album booklet.

Studios
 Recorded at O'Henry Studios (Burbank, California), Record One (Los Angeles), and Record Plant (Hollywood, California)
 Mixed at South Beach Studios (Miami Beach, Florida)
 Mastered at Sterling Sound (New York City)

Personnel

 Anastacia – writing, vocals, background vocals
 Glen Ballard – writing, keyboards, production
 Dallas Austin – writing, guitars, keyboards, MIDI drums, production
 Siedah Garrett – background vocals
 Lisa Vaughn – background vocals
 Audrey Wheeler – background vocals
 Tim Pierce – guitars
 Tony Reyes – guitars
 Colin Wolfe – bass
 Sean Hurley – bass
 Josh Freese – drums
 Ric Wake – lead vocal production
 William Malina – recording
 Rick Sheppard – recording, MIDI and sound design
 Thomas R. Yezzi – recording (vocals)
 Tom Lord-Alge – mixing
 Femio Hernandez – second mix engineer
 Cesar Guevara – assistant engineering
 Ted Jensen – mastering

Charts

Weekly charts

Year-end charts

Decade-end charts

Certifications

Release history

References

2004 singles
2004 songs
Anastacia songs
Daylight Records singles
Epic Records singles
Music videos directed by Bryan Barber
Number-one singles in Australia
Number-one singles in Austria
Number-one singles in the Czech Republic
Number-one singles in Italy
Number-one singles in Scotland
Number-one singles in Spain
Number-one singles in Switzerland
Song recordings produced by Dallas Austin
Song recordings produced by Glen Ballard
Songs about loneliness
Songs written by Anastacia
Songs written by Dallas Austin
Songs written by Glen Ballard